Unia is an album by Sonata Arctica.

Unia may also refer to:

 Unia, Greater Poland Voivodeship, a village in west-central Poland
 Unia (union) a Swiss trade union
 UNIA, short for the Universal Negro Improvement Association and African Communities League
 Unia or Uniates, a name given to the Eastern Catholic Churches
 UNIA, short of the International University of Andalucía, a Spanish public University in Andalusia
 Unia, the Belgian Centre for Equal Opportunities